Achnashellach (Gaelic: Achadh nan Seileach) is an area in Wester Ross in the Highlands of Scotland, and within the Highland council area. It is at the eastern end of Loch Dùghaill, and on the A890 road. It has a railway station on the Kyle of Lochalsh Line.

The name is from the Gaelic for 'field of the willows'. It is recorded in 1584 as Auchinsellach.

The Battle of Achnashellach is said to have taken place in 1505.

See also 
Achnashellach Forest

References

External links 
Its entry in the Gazetteer for Scotland
the Achnashellach Hostel

Populated places in Ross and Cromarty